Flying Ducks is a 1970 or 1983 sculpture by Tom Hardy, installed on the west façade of Lawrence Hall, on the University of Oregon campus, in Eugene, Oregon, United States.

Description and history
The artwork was donated to the School of Architecture and Allied Arts in 1984 by Hugh Klopfenstein and his wife.

The metal sculpture is approximately  x  x , and its concrete base measures approximately  x  x . It was surveyed by Smithsonian Institution's "Save Outdoor Sculpture!" program in 1994, and was previously installed at Willamette Hall.

See also

 1970 in art

References

1970 sculptures
Sculptures of birds in Oregon
Metal sculptures
Outdoor sculptures in Eugene, Oregon
University of Oregon campus